The ISAF Offshore Team World Championship are bi-annually since 2004 held by the Yacht Club Costa Smeralda in Sardinia Italy and are run in cooperation with the Offshore Racing Congress.

References

External links
 ISAF Microsite
 YCCS
 ISAF Team Racing World Championship- History

World Sailing
Offshore